Flash Media Live Encoder (FMLE) was a free live encoding software product from Adobe Systems. It was available for Microsoft Windows and Mac OS.

History 
Version 1.0 was released on February 23, 2007.

Version 2.0 was released on October 26, 2007, adding the following functionality:
Encoding support for MP3 format
Command-line execution
Automatically start at operating system launch
Automated maintenance restart
Remote access
Ability to set reconnect interval
Timecode support

Version 2.5 was released on April 14, 2008 with the following added features:
Encoding support for H.264/HE-AAC format 
Improvements to Quality of Service
Auto-adjust functionality, which enabled dynamic downgrading of the outgoing stream quality if network connectivity was sub-optimal.

Version 3.0 was released on January 12, 2009 with the following added features:
An updated user interface and additional presets
Multi-bitrate encoding (up to three different bitrates)
File management improvements (save multiple files based on file size/duration, parameters in filenames)
DVR functionality 
System timecode support (SMPTE, LTC, VITC or BITC timecodes could be used if supported by capture device; if not, the system timecode could be used)
Multi-core processing capability for VP6 encoding
Support for additional compatible devices

Version 3.2 was the last supported release. Adobe ended support in 2016.

Usage 
Stream live video from capture cards, webcams, Firewire, or USB devices to Flash Media Server (FMS) or a Flash Video Streaming Service (FVSS). (Device or driver must support Microsoft DirectShow filters to be recognized by FMLE.)
Archive FLV or F4V file locally.

Function 
FMLE is a desktop application that connects to a Flash Media Server (FMS) or a Flash Video Streaming Service (FVSS) via the Real Time Messaging Protocol (RTMP) to stream live video to connected clients. Clients connect to the FMS or FVSS server and view the stream through a Flash Player SWF.
or Nellymoser for audio. Additionally, AAC and HE-AAC for audio is supported with a plug-in available from MainConcept

In addition to encoding live events with finite start and end times, features such as command-line control, auto reconnect, and remote access enable efficient 24/7 encoding.

See also 
ActionScript
Flash Player

References 

Flash Media Live Encoder 2.5 Documentation
Flash Media Live Encoder 3 Documentation

External links 
Adobe Flash Media Live Encoder product page
Adobe Flash Media Server product page
Adobe Flash Media Server Developer Center
Player for Adobe Flash Media Video

Adobe Flash